Stephenson Avenue refers to two separate sections of road in the western suburbs of Perth, Western Australia.

The first section is a  section of two-lane dual carriageway linking Flax Way to Pearson Street and Jon Sanders Drive in Osborne Park via Scarborough Beach Road. The second, longer section is a  two-lane single carriageway in Mount Claremont used to link central Perth to West Coast Highway via Hay Street, Underwood Avenue and Rochdale Road.

The two sections of road are to date the only evidence of the originally proposed Stephenson Highway, a controversial highway that was proposed to connect Swanbourne to Innaloo. Evidence of previous attempts to extend the section north of Flax Way to the Mitchell Freeway can be seen on Landgate aerial photos from 1985, however only the section south to Jon Sanders Drive has been completed to date.

The two roads are named after Gordon Stephenson, an influential person in the development and expansion of Perth through the Metropolitan Region Scheme during the 20th century.

History
An arterial road branching north from what was then West Coast Highway (now Rochdale Road), through Bold Park, past the edge of Herdsman Lake, and then continuing north to Hamersley, was included in the 1955 Stephenson-Hepburn Report. The 1962 preliminary edition of the Metropolitan Region Scheme, which was derived from the report, included a controlled-access highway on a similar alignment, with the addition of what is now the Mitchell Freeway terminating at it while it continued north. The 1963 first gazetted edition of the Metropolitan Region Scheme retained virtually the same route from West Coast Highway, but amended the northern part to terminate at what is now the Mitchell Freeway, while the Mitchell Freeway would extend north instead.

In 1962, the Mount Claremont section from Rochdale Road (then West Coast Highway) to Underwood Avenue was completed to provide access to Perry Lakes Stadium and other facilities constructed for the 1962 British Empire and Commonwealth Games.

In the early 1990s, as part of the Northern Suburbs Transit System project, Stirling railway station was constructed in the median strip of the Mitchell Freeway immediately south of Cedric Street, ultimately opening in 1993. The station's location had presented some interesting design challenges for the future extension of Stephenson Highway over the Mitchell Freeway as the road reserve for the future highway initially ran directly over the station at the southern end of its platforms. During the design of the station and its approach roads, the engineering firm Ove Arup & Partners was tasked with investigating and designing road layouts to accommodate for both future and current needs. Due to the nature of the future Stephenson Highway, a number of road layout options were considered including:
Original designs first proposed for the freeway by the Main Roads Department, consisting of a diamond interchange between Scarborough Beach Road and Stephenson Highway, with links to the existing Oswald Street and Osborne Park.
As per the above option, but without the Osborne Park link.
As per the above option, but without the link of Oswald Street between Scarborough Beach Road and Cedric Street (an option recommended by station designers Hames Sharley architects).
A design only known as the Forbes and Fitzhardinge planning scheme, of which no information or design drawings exist within the engineers' report.

All of the above designs involved significantly complex road layouts which amongst others included partial cloverleaf interchanges, and the construction of new bridges connecting the future highway to Cedric Street.

In 1994, the Osborne Park section from Scarborough Beach Road to Jon Sanders Drive was completed as the Stirling Link Road. While it was designed with providing the connection between the Mitchell Freeway and a potential future Stephenson Highway in mind, its primary purpose was to act as a feeder from the Mitchell Freeway to Innaloo.

In October 2011, the Metropolitan Region Scheme was amended to rezone the Stephenson Highway road reserve north of Jon Sanders Drive to the Mitchell Freeway to "City Centre". This was desired by the City of Stirling on the basis that the reserve prevented it from developing into a true city centre. While an extension of Stephenson Avenue to the Mitchell Freeway would continue, it would be as a "low key road" with on-street parking, while Stephenson Highway's intended freight functions would be adopted by an extended Hutton Street.

Extension project
Currently underway as of January 2023 is the extension of Stephenson Avenue northwards from Scarborough Beach Road, to connect to Cedric Street and the Mitchell Freeway.

It is two lanes in each direction, with on street parking. This is unlike the previously existing section of Stephenson Avenue to the south, which is a controlled access road. There is also an intersection with Oswald Street, which was extended to the east of its previous intersection with Ellen Stirling Boulevard. Both intersections have traffic lights. This phase began construction in August 2020 and aimed to be completed by September 2021. It opened for traffic on 11 February 2022.

The second phase of construction is by Main Roads Western Australia, and extends the road further, over the Mitchell Freeway to connect to Cedric Street. Stephenson Avenue will have a diamond interchange with the freeway, intended to supersede the current diamond interchange with Cedric Street, which will be demolished. A new access road will be provided from Stephenson Avenue to the Stirling railway station carpark. As part of the same project, the Stirling station bus interchange will have a new bridge added to it, increasing the number of bus stands from 9 to 30. This phase began construction in March 2022 and originally aimed to be completed by late 2023. 

In November 2022, the second phase completion date was delayed to February 2024 and then September 2024 after design disagreements between stakeholders. Further disruption was caused by the collapse of Clough, which had been contracted to deliver the project in a joint venture with Acciona and WSP, though the government denied further delays were anticipated.

Intersections

Stephenson Avenue (Osborne Park)

Stephenson Avenue (Mount Claremont)

Notes

References

Streets in Perth, Western Australia